Strandebarm Church is a parish church of the Church of Norway in Kvam Municipality in Vestland county, Norway. It is located in the village of Bru. It is the church for the Strandebarm parish which is part of the Hardanger og Voss prosti (deanery) in the Diocese of Bjørgvin. The white, wooden church was built in a long church design in 1876 using plans drawn up by the architect Ole Vangberg. The church seats about 550 people. Historically, this was the main church for the old Strandebarm municipality.

History
The earliest existing historical records of the church date back to the year 1306, but the church was built before that time. The first church at Bru was a wooden stave church that was likely built in the 13th century. In 1659, there was a large fire and the medieval church and neighboring farm both burned down. A new timber-framed cruciform church was built on the same site between 1659 and 1661. In 1737, the church was sold to the magister Ole Gjerdrum. Later, it was sold back to the parish.

In 1814, this church served as an election church. Together with more than 300 other parish churches across Norway, it was a polling station for elections to the 1814 Norwegian Constituent Assembly which wrote the Constitution of Norway. This was Norway's first national elections. Each church parish was a constituency that elected people called "electors" who later met together in each county to elect the representatives for the assembly that was to meet in Eidsvoll later that year.

By the 1870s, the old church was too small for the parish. In 1876, it was decided to tear down the old church and build a newer, larger church. The white, wooden church, which seats about 550 people, was designed by the architect Ole Vangberg. The new church was consecrated on 18 August 1876. After the new church was completed, the old church was torn down.

See also
List of churches in Bjørgvin

References

Kvam
Churches in Vestland
Long churches in Norway
Wooden churches in Norway
19th-century Church of Norway church buildings
Churches completed in 1876
13th-century establishments in Norway
Norwegian election church